Ives González Alonso (born 12 October 1980) is a water polo player from Brazil. He was part of the Brazilian team at the 2016 Summer Olympics, where the team was eliminated in the quarterfinals. He was also a member of the team that won silver at the 2015 Pan American Games.

References

Brazilian male water polo players
Living people
1980 births
Water polo players at the 2015 Pan American Games
Pan American Games medalists in water polo
Pan American Games silver medalists for Brazil
Olympic water polo players of Brazil
Water polo players at the 2016 Summer Olympics
Medalists at the 2015 Pan American Games
21st-century Brazilian people